Caroline Teresa O'Connor (born 25 April 1983 in Ealing) is a British rowing cox who finished fifth in the women's eight at the 2008 Summer Olympics.

Rowing career
O'Connor finished in fifth place in the women's eight at the 2008 Olympic Games.

She was part of the British squad that topped the medal table at the 2011 World Rowing Championships in Bled, where she won a bronze medal as part of the eight with Alison Knowles, Jo Cook, Jessica Eddie, Louisa Reeve, Natasha Page, Lindsey Maguire, Katie Greves and Victoria Thornley.

References 

 
 
 GB Rowing Team

1983 births
Living people
English female rowers
British female rowers
People from Ealing
Rowers at the 2008 Summer Olympics
Rowers at the 2012 Summer Olympics
Coxswains (rowing)
Olympic rowers of Great Britain
World Rowing Championships medalists for Great Britain